Scott A. Frantz (born June 7, 1996) is an American former college football player who was an offensive tackle for the Kansas State Wildcats. He earned second-team all-conference honors in the Big 12 as a senior in 2019.

Frantz attended Free State High School in Lawrence, Kansas, before committing to play at Kansas State University. In 2017, Frantz publicly came out as gay, joining My-King Johnson as two of the first openly gay players in the NCAA Division I Football Bowl Subdivision (FBS). Later that same year, Frantz became the first openly gay college football player to play in a game for an FBS school. He started 51 straight games for the Wildcats and was named second-team All-Big-12 in his senior year in 2019.

He went undrafted in the 2020 NFL draft.

See also
Homosexuality in American football

References

External links
Kansas State bio

Living people
1996 births
Sportspeople from Lawrence, Kansas
Kansas State Wildcats football players
American football offensive tackles
Gay sportsmen
American LGBT sportspeople
LGBT people from Kansas
LGBT players of American football